The Kröller-Müller Museum is a national art museum and sculpture garden, located in the Hoge Veluwe National Park in Otterlo in the Netherlands. The museum, founded by art collector Helene Kröller-Müller within the extensive grounds of her and her husband's former estate (now the national park), opened in 1938. It has the second-largest collection of paintings by Vincent van Gogh, after the Van Gogh Museum. The museum had 380,000 visitors in 2015.

History 

The Kröller-Müller Museum was founded by Helene Kröller-Müller, an avid art collector who, being advised by H.P. Bremmer, was one of the first to recognize Vincent van Gogh's genius and collect his works. In 1935, she donated her whole collection to the state of the Netherlands. In 1938, the museum, which was designed by Henry van de Velde, opened to the public. The sculpture garden was added in 1961 and the new exhibition wing, designed by Wim Quist, opened in 1977.

Collection 

The museum has a considerable collection of paintings by Vincent van Gogh, such  as Café Terrace at Night, Sorrowing Old Man (At Eternity's Gate) and a version of The Potato Eaters, making it the second-largest collection of Van Gogh paintings in the world (after the Van Gogh Museum in Amsterdam). Apart from the Van Gogh paintings other highlights include works by Piet Mondrian, Georges-Pierre Seurat, Odilon Redon, Georges Braque, Paul Gauguin, Lucas Cranach, James Ensor, Juan Gris, William Degouve de Nuncques and Pablo Picasso.

Sculpture garden 
The garden reflects Helene Kröller-Müller's conception of a symbiosis between art, architecture and nature. The collection includes works by Auguste Rodin, Henry Moore, Jean Dubuffet, Mark di Suvero, Lucio Fontana, Claes Oldenburg and Coosje van Bruggen, Fritz Wotruba, Joep van Lieshout and many more.

Selected collection highlights

Administration 

Lisette Pelsers has been museum director of the Kröller-Müller Museum since 2012.

The museum had 307,000 visitors in 2012, 330,000 visitors in 2013, 392,000 in 2014, and 380,000 in 2015.

The museum was the 12th most visited museum nationally in 2013.

See also
List of museums in Amsterdam
List of museums in the Netherlands
List of most visited museums in the Netherlands

References

Further reading
Kröller-Müller State Museum, Otterlo. Netherlands: Kröller-Müller State Museum, 1973.

External links

 
 Tour of the Kröller-Müller and grounds
Kröller-Müller Museum within Google Arts & Culture

1938 establishments in the Netherlands
Art museums established in 1938
Contemporary art galleries in the Netherlands
Former private collections
Henry van de Velde buildings
Modern art museums
Museums in Gelderland
National museums of the Netherlands
Rijksmonuments in Ede, Netherlands
Sculpture gardens, trails and parks in Europe
20th-century architecture in the Netherlands